The R708 is a Regional Route in South Africa that connects Jan Kempdorp in the Northern Cape with Clocolan in the Free State via Christiana, Hertzogville, Bultfontein, Theunissen, Winburg and Marquard.

Route

North West
Its north-western terminus is the N18 at Jan Kempdorp, Northern Cape. It heads eastwards, immediately crossing into the North West, to meet the R506 at Christiana. From that intersection, it flies over the N12, and becomes Voortrekker Street in the town centre and leaves to the south-east, crossing the Vaal River to enter the Free State.

Free State
The first town it passes through is Hertzogville and just outside the town, the R59 intersects the R708 as a t-junction and both routes are cosigned for 1.8 km southwards before the R708 becomes its own road east-south-east to Bultfontein. At Bultfontein, it intersects the R700 and both routes are cosigned southwards for 1.8 km before the R708 becomes its own road eastwards just south of the town centre and it proceeds to Theunissen.

North of the town, it meets the R30 at a t-junction. Cosigned for 1.4 km, both head southwards before the R708 becomes its own road south-east just north of the Theunissen town centre. From Theunissen, it heads to Winburg. It meets the N1 National Highway and the N5 National Route (at its western origin) just north-west of the town.

From the N1 interchange, it is co-signed with the N5 eastwards for 9 kilometres, bypassing Winburg to the north (where the R709 provides access to the town centre), before diverging and becoming its own road south-east, proceeding to Marquard. At Marquard, it meets the R707's southern terminus. From Marquard, the route heads south-south-east to Clocolan, where it meets the eastern terminus of the R703. It proceeds for a few more kilometres to end at a junction with the R26.

References

Regional Routes in the Free State (province)
Regional Routes in North West (South African province)